Phyllachorales is a small order of perithecial sac fungi containing mostly foliar parasites. This order lacks reliable morphological characters making taxonomic placement of genera difficult. There is controversy among mycologists as to the boundaries of this order. Family Phaeochorellaceae was added in 2020.

Characteristics
In general, members of the Phyllachoraceae produce an ascocarp embedded in the host tissue, mostly within a stroma or beneath an epidermal clypeus. The type of development is ascohymenial.

Genera incertae sedis

Cyclodomus
Lichenochora

Maculatifrondes
Mangrovispora
Palmomyces
Phycomelaina
Uropolystigma

References

 
Ascomycota orders